Lenin in Poland (translit. Lenin v Polshe) is a 1966 Soviet drama film directed by Sergei Yutkevich. Yutkevich won the award for Best Director at the 1966 Cannes Film Festival.

Cast
 Maksim Shtraukh - Vladimir Ilich Lenin
 Anna Lisyanskaya - Nadezhda Krupskaya
 Antonina Pavlycheva - Krupskaya's Mother
 Ilona Kusmierska - Ulka
 Edmund Fetting - Honecki
 Krzysztof Kalczynski - Andrzej
 Tadeusz Fijewski - Secretary of the Prison
 Gustaw Lutkiewicz - Investigator
 Kazimierz Rudzki - Priest
 Zbigniew Skowronski - Matyszezuk
 Jarema Stepowski - Photographer

References

External links

1966 films
1966 in the Soviet Union
1966 drama films
1960s Russian-language films
Soviet black-and-white films
Films directed by Sergei Yutkevich
Films about Vladimir Lenin
Soviet drama films